is a professional Japanese baseball player. He plays pitcher for the Orix Buffaloes.

External links

 NPB.com

1990 births
Living people
People from Tsushima, Aichi
Baseball people from Aichi Prefecture
Japanese baseball players
Nippon Professional Baseball pitchers
Tokyo Yakult Swallows players
Orix Buffaloes players